Mahendrasinh Chauhan (born 1 November 1953 in Village-Bamanva District-Mehsana) is an Indian politician from Gujarat State and member of Bhartiya Janata Party. He has been a member of 15th Lok Sabha from Sabarkantha (Lok Sabha constituency) from 2009 to 2014.

References

1953 births
People from Sabarkantha district
India MPs 2009–2014
Lok Sabha members from Gujarat
Living people
Bharatiya Janata Party politicians from Gujarat